Pierre Danos (4 June 1929 – 16 January 2023) was a French rugby player, who played for AS Béziers which he won one title of French Champion, in 1961 and one Challenge Yves du Manoir. He earned his first cap with the French national team on 29 July 1954 against Argentina at Buenos Aires. He was called for the 1958 France rugby union tour of South Africa.

Danos died on 16 January 2023, at the age of 93.

Honours 
 Selected to represent France, 1954–1960
1958 France rugby union tour of South Africa
Five Nations 1959
AS Béziers
French rugby champion, 1961
Challenge Yves du Manoir 1964
French championship finalist 1960, 1962 and 1964
European Champion Clubs' Cup (organized by the FIRA) 1962

References

External links
ESPN profile

1929 births
2023 deaths
French rugby union players
Rugby union scrum-halves
France international rugby union players
AS Béziers Hérault players
RC Toulonnais players
SC Albi players
French rugby union coaches
Rugby union players from Toulouse